The 2021 Tour de Pologne was the 78th running of the Tour de Pologne road cycling stage race, which was part of the 2021 UCI World Tour. It started on 9 August in Lublin, and ended on 15 August in Kraków.

Teams 
All nineteen UCI WorldTeams, two wildcard UCI ProTeams, and the Polish national team made up the twenty-two teams that participated in the race. Of the 151 riders who started the race, 140 finished.

UCI WorldTeams

 
 
 
 
 
 
 
 
 
 
 
 
 
 
 
 
 
 
 

UCI ProTeams

 
 

National Teams

 Poland

Schedule

Stages

Stage 1 
9 August 2021 – Lublin to Chełm,

Stage 2 
10 August 2021 – Zamość to Przemyśl,

Stage 3 
11 August 2021 – Sanok to Rzeszów,

Stage 4 
12 August 2021 – Tarnów to Bukovina Resort,

Stage 5 
13 August 2021 – Chochołów / Gmina Czarny Dunajec to Bielsko-Biała,

Stage 6 
14 August 2021 – Katowice to Katowice,  (ITT)

Stage 7 
15 August 2021 – Zabrze to Kraków,

Classification leadership table 

 On stage 2, Álvaro Hodeg, who was second in the sprints classification, wore the white jersey, because first-placed Phil Bauhaus wore the yellow jersey as the leader of the general classification.
 On stage 7, Michał Kwiatkowski, who was second in the sprints classification, wore the white jersey, because first-placed João Almeida wore the yellow jersey as the leader of the general classification.

Final classification standings

General classification

Sprints classification

Mountains classification

Active rider classification

Team classification

Notes

References

External links 

2021
2021 UCI World Tour
August 2021 sports events in Poland
2021 in Polish sport